The 1818 Rhode Island gubernatorial election was an election held on April 15, 1818 to elect the Governor of Rhode Island. Nehemiah Rice Knight, the incumbent Governor and Democratic-Republican nominee, beat Elisha Reynolds Potter, the Federalist candidate with 53.60% of the vote.

General election

Candidates
Nehemiah Rice Knight, the incumbent Governor since 1817.
Elisha R. Potter, member of the US House of Representatives for Rhode Island 1809-1815.

Results

County results

References

Rhode Island gubernatorial elections
1818 Rhode Island elections
Rhode Island
April 1818 events